Charles McInally (born 1 February 1939) is a Scottish retired professional football wing half who played in the Football League for Brentford. He also played in the Scottish League for Albion Rovers.

Personal life 
McInally's son Tony played for Queen's Park and Albion Rovers in the Scottish League and as a manager he won the 2011–12 Scottish Junior Cup with Shotts Bon Accord.

Career statistics

References

1939 births
Scottish footballers
English Football League players
Brentford F.C. players
Living people
Footballers from Glasgow
Association football wing halves
St Roch's F.C. players
Albion Rovers F.C. players
Petershill F.C. players
Scottish Football League players
Scottish Junior Football Association players